Cumare may refer to:
 Cumare (bug), a genus of true bugs in the family Tessaratomidae
Astrocaryum aculeatum, a palm native to South America and Trinidad.
 Mistress in southern Italian dialects and Italian American slang.